Tripp Bay is a bay along the coast of Victoria Land formed by a recession in the ice between the Oates Piedmont Glacier and Evans Piedmont Glacier. The bay was first charted by the British Antarctic Expedition, 1907–09. The name appears to have been first used by the British Antarctic Expedition (1910–13) and derives from Tripp Island which lies within the bay.

References

Bays of Victoria Land
Scott Coast